Martin Ouellet is a Canadian politician, who was elected to the National Assembly of Quebec in a by-election on November 9, 2015. He represents the electoral district of René-Lévesque as a member of the Parti Québécois.

References

Living people
Parti Québécois MNAs
21st-century Canadian politicians
Year of birth missing (living people)
Université Laval alumni